Aurélien Gill,  (August 26, 1933 – January 17, 2015) was a Canadian businessman, teacher and politician. Gill served in the Senate of Canada from his appointment in 1998 until his retirement in 2008.

Early life
Born in Mashteuiatsh, the only Native community in Saguenay–Lac-Saint-Jean, Quebec, Gill received a bachelor's degree in pedagogy from Université Laval.

An Aboriginal businessman and advocate, Gill also has a background as a teacher and government administrator having been Quebec Director-General of the Department of Indian and Northern Affairs. He was founding president of the Conseil Attikamek-Montagnais and chief of the Mashteuiatsh Montagnais community from 1975 to 1982 and from 1987 to 1989.

Gill was made a Knight of the National Order of Quebec in 1991.

Political career
Gill ran for a seat to the House of Commons of Canada in the 1993 Canadian federal election. He faced three other candidates in the electoral district of Roberval. Gill was defeated by Bloc Québécois candidate Michel Gauthier finishing second, he also finished ahead of future Member of Parliament Alain Giguère who finished a distant fourth place.

He was appointed to the Senate on the advice of Prime Minister Jean Chrétien on September 17, 1998. He sat as a Liberal representing the Quebec senatorial district of Wellington. He retired from the Senate on his 75th birthday on August 26, 2008. Gill died on January 17, 2015.

References

 

1933 births
2015 deaths
21st-century Canadian politicians
20th-century First Nations people
21st-century First Nations people
Canadian senators from Quebec
First Nations politicians
Indigenous Canadian senators
Indigenous leaders in Quebec
Innu people
Knights of the National Order of Quebec
Liberal Party of Canada senators
Members of the Order of Canada
People from Saguenay–Lac-Saint-Jean
Université Laval alumni